Irvine Uberto Masters (February 4, 1823 – November 13, 1865(?)) was an Ohio ship builder who served as the mayor of Cleveland, Ohio, from 1863 to 1864.

Early life
Masters was born in New York and moved to Cleveland with his first wife, Naomi, in 1851.

Political career
Masters became a trustee of Ohio City. He later helped William B. Castle negotiate the merger between Cleveland and Ohio City. Masters was a member of the Cleveland City Council and was the president of the City Council three times and officially welcomed Abraham Lincoln when he visited Cleveland in 1861. Masters defeated his successor, Edward S. Flint, because of his Republican views during the Civil War.

Masters resigned from office on May 17, 1864, when he was diagnosed with tuberculosis. He subsequently sold his part of Peck & Masters shipbuilding company.

Personal life
Masters married Naomi A. Bronson on October 1, 1847. The couple had four children: Willis U. (born 1853; died September 1898), Harriet (born 1855; died April 1872), Main S. (born 1857; died February 1883), and Julius H. (born October 1860; died March 1862). Naomi Masters died on February 9, 1862. Masters then married M. Augusta Prull on October 27, 1863.

After resigning from the Cleveland City Council in May 1864, Masters moved to New England and then Nova Scotia to regain his health. His illness worsening, he moved to Pine Island, Minnesota, where he died a few days before November 14, 1865.

Irvine U. Masters' funeral was held in his former home in Cleveland on November 17, 1865. He was buried at the Monroe Street Cemetery in Cleveland.

References

Further reading
 The Encyclopedia Of Cleveland History by Cleveland Bicentennial Commission (Cleveland, Ohio), David D. Van Tassel (Editor), and John J. Grabowski (Editor) 

Mayors of Cleveland
1823 births
1865 deaths
19th-century American politicians
People from Pine Island, Minnesota
Burials at Monroe Street Cemetery